Hawker Creek is a stream in Bollinger County in the U.S. state of Missouri. It was a tributary to the Castor River, but now flows into the Headwater Diversion Channel.

Hawker Creek thas the name of a pioneer who settled near it.

See also
List of rivers of Missouri

References

Rivers of Bollinger County, Missouri
Rivers of Missouri